Andre Dwayne Russell (born 29 April 1988) is a Jamaican who has played international cricket for  West Indies and for Jamaica in domestic cricket as an all-rounder. He currently plays in various T20 leagues around the globe. Russell was part of 2012 and 2016 ICC World T20 winning West Indies team. He has played in more than 300 T20 matches for a range of sides in leagues.

Domestic career
In 2010, Russell played at Barnards Green Cricket Club in Worcestershire, England, helping them secure promotion from Worcestershire Cricket League into Birmingham League cricket.

On 21 September 2013, in a match against India A, Russell became the first bowler in T20 cricket to take four wickets in successive deliveries.

International career
A fast bowling all-rounder, Russell made his Test cricket debut against Sri Lanka in November 2010. This is the only Test match of his career.

He made his One Day International (ODI) debut in the 2011 Cricket World Cup match against Ireland at Mohali. After a poor home series against Pakistan, he made his mark against in the ODI series against India. After being dropped from the first two ODIs, he scored 92 not out off 64 balls in the 3rd ODI after coming to the crease at 96/7. In the 5th ODI at Sabina Park in Kingston, he was named the Player of the Match as he took 4/35 (from 8.3 overs) to dismiss India for 251 in 47.1 overs.

He was named in the 'Team of the Tournament' for the 2016 T20 World Cup by the ICC, Cricinfo and Cricbuzz.

In April 2019, he was named in the West Indies' squad for the 2019 Cricket World Cup. In the West Indies match against Australia, Russell became the quickest batsman, in terms of balls faced, to score 1,000 runs in ODIs, facing only 767 deliveries. However, on 24 June 2019, Russell was ruled out of the rest of the tournament, due to a knee injury, and was replaced by Sunil Ambris.

On 9 July 2021, during the first T20I against Australia, Russell scored his maiden T20I half-century. He scored 51 off 28 balls and helped West Indies post 145 before being dismissed by Josh Hazlewood.

In September 2021, Russell was named in the West Indies' squad for the 2021 ICC Men's T20 World Cup.

T20 franchise career
Russell has played in over 300 T20 matches and appeared for teams in a number of franchise leagues. He was also named in the T20 XI of the years 2016 and 2018 by Cricinfo.

Indian Premier League

During the 2012 Indian Premier League Players Auction, he was bought by the Delhi Daredevils for a sum of $450,000. Ahead of the 2014 season he was bought by Kolkata Knight Riders and has been seen as a key batsman for the team in the later overs of matches. For his performances in 2015, he was named in the Cricinfo IPL XI for the season. He was on course to win the IPL Super Striker award in 2018, awarded for having the highest strike rate in the tournament, before being pipped by his teammate Sunil Narine. He eventually won it next year in the 2019 IPL, where he had a record IPL season strike rate of over 205, and was also announced as the Player of the Tournament. In an otherwise unsuccessful season, he emerged as both the highest run scorer and the highest wicket taker for his team, while also being the third-highest run-scorer in the tournament. He hit 52 sixes in the tournament; only Chris Gayle has hit more sixes in any single season of the IPL. For his performances in the 2019 IPL season, he was named in the Cricinfo IPL XI.

On 13 April 2021, he took figures of 5/15 off just two overs in a match against Mumbai Indians during the 2021 Indian Premier League. With the bat, he scored 9 runs off 15 balls as Kolkata lost the game by 10 runs.

Other T20 leagues
On 16 August 2016 Russell scored the fastest Caribbean Premier League century, completing his 100 in 42 balls. He broke his own CPL record in 2018 with a century in 40 balls.

In May 2018, he was named as one of the ten marquee players for the first edition of the Global T20 Canada cricket tournament. He was selected to play for the Vancouver Knights.

In September 2018, he was named as the Icon Player for Nangarhar's squad in the first edition of the Afghanistan Premier League tournament. The following month, he was named in the squad for the Dhaka Dynamites in the 2018–19 Bangladesh Premier League. In June 2019, he was selected to play for the Vancouver Knights franchise team in the 2019 Global T20 Canada tournament.

In July 2020, he was named in the Jamaica Tallawahs squad for the 2020 Caribbean Premier League. In October 2020, he was drafted by the Colombo Kings for the inaugural edition of the Lanka Premier League. In April 2021, he was signed by Quetta Gladiators to play in the rescheduled matches in the 2021 Pakistan Super League.

Russell was picked by Southern Brave for The Hundred Cricket 2021 edition. In April 2022, he was bought by the Manchester Originals for the 2022 season of The Hundred.

Doping
According to the Jamaica Anti-Doping Commission (JADCO), in 2016 Russell committed an "anti-doping whereabouts" violation after missing three doping tests in a 12-month period. On 31 January 2017, Russell was banned from cricket for one year.

Personal life
Russell married American model Jassym Lora in 2016; the couple have a daughter.

Outside cricket
In 2014, Russell began a second career as a recording artist under the name 'Dre Russ', with two singles released in November, one a collaboration with Beenie Man.

Notes

References

External links

 
 Andre Russell's profile page on Wisden

Living people
1988 births
Sportspeople from Kingston, Jamaica
Jamaican cricketers
Jamaican expatriate sportspeople in India
West Indies Test cricketers
West Indies One Day International cricketers
West Indies Twenty20 International cricketers
Cricketers at the 2011 Cricket World Cup
Cricketers at the 2015 Cricket World Cup
Cricketers at the 2019 Cricket World Cup
Jamaica cricketers
Khulna Tigers cricketers
Delhi Capitals cricketers
Worcestershire cricketers
Jamaica Tallawahs cricketers
Kolkata Knight Riders cricketers
Knights cricketers
Melbourne Renegades cricketers
Comilla Victorians cricketers
Sydney Thunder cricketers
Islamabad United cricketers
Nottinghamshire cricketers
Dhaka Dominators cricketers
Nangarhar Leopards cricketers
Multan Sultans cricketers
Rajshahi Royals cricketers
Colombo Stars cricketers
Quetta Gladiators cricketers
Melbourne Stars cricketers
Manchester Originals cricketers